Marilou Yap Gumabao (born December 20, 1958), professionally known as Isabel Rivas is a Filipino actress and businesswoman. She is the younger sister of former actor Dennis Roldan.

Career
She was introduced as a sexy nymphet in Celso Ad. Castillo's steamy movie, Uhaw Na Dagat (1980). She appeared movies such as Burgis (1981), Kung Mahawi Man Ang Ulap (1984), Ang Bukas Ay Akin (1989), Barumbado (1990), Alyas Baby Face (1990), and Dahil Mahal Na Mahal Kita (1998).

In 1995 Rivas was a regular in the GMA Telenovela Villa Quintana for which she received a Best Actress Nomination

In 1999 she was cast in ABS-CBN's Primetime Drama Saan Ka Man Naroroon, the critically acclaimed drama that ran for two years. She starred as a lead antagonist on the show. She was reunited with her co star Rico Yan who was in the film Dahil Mahal Na Mahal Kita in 1998.

Rivas appeared in 2001 TV series Recuerdo de Amor, aired in ABS-CBN, starring Diether Ocampo and Carmina Villaroel and Kahit Isang Saglit with Jericho Rosales and Malaysian actress Carmen Soo.

She won the 1996 Star Awards for Television Best Drama Actress in Villa Quintana and she also nominated for Best Actress in a Drama Series by the PMPC in 2002 for Recuerdo de Amor.

On television, she joined the cast of Tepok Bunot (1981–82) a daily sitcom over Maharlika Broadcasting System – Channel 4 as the colegiala-speaking friend of Roderick Paulate and Bibeth Orteza.

In 2018, she returned to showbiz via ABS-CBN's series Los Bastardos.

In November 2019, she made a comeback in GMA-7 to star in the television series with Nora Aunor in Bilangin ang Bituin sa Langit based on the movie of the same title. She was previously seen on the network during 2012–2013 via Pahiram ng Sandali.

Personal life

She manages and owns a farm in Iba, Zambales, Philippines.

Filmography

Television

Selected movies
Dahil Mahal Na Mahal Kita - Suzanne Quirino (1998)
Istokwa (1996)
Pare Ko (1995)
Maricris Sioson: Japayuki (1993)
Beautiful Girl (1990)
Barumbado (1990)
Ang Bukas Ay Akin (1989)
Hari sa Hari, Lahi sa Lahi (1987)
Macho Gigolo (1986)
Heartache City (1985)
Kung Mahawi Man Ang Ulap - Chona Acuesta (1984)
Aninong Bakal (1983)
Akin Ang Paghihiganti (1982)
Uhaw Na Dagat (1981)
Kambal Sa Uma (1979)
9 De Pebrero (1979)

References

External links

1958 births
Living people
Actresses from Manila
Actresses of Chinese descent
20th-century Filipino actresses
21st-century Filipino businesspeople
Filipino film actresses
Filipino television personalities
Filipino people of Chinese descent
Filipino women in business
People from Zambales
21st-century Filipino actresses
GMA Network personalities
ABS-CBN personalities